Now: The Hits of Summer 2012 is a compilation of songs popular in Australia during summer 2011. The album was the 15th compilation of 2011 and the 46th compilation of 2012. It was certified gold.

Track listing
Disc 1
Cobra Starship featuring Sabi – "You Make Me Feel..." (3:35)
Jason Derulo – "It Girl" (3:12)
Ricki-Lee – "Raining Diamonds" (3:06)
Bruno Mars – "Grenade" (3:43)
Simple Plan featuring Rivers Cuomo – "Can't Keep My Hands off You" (3:20)
These Kids Wear Crowns – "Jumpstart" (3:29)
We the Kings – "Check Yes Juliet" (3:38)
Good Charlotte – "Last Night" (3:40)
Panic! at the Disco – "Let's Kill Tonight" (3:33)
Alexandra Stan – "Mr. Saxobeat" (3:15)
Wynter Gordon – "Buy My Love" (3:08)
J. Williams featuring Dane Rumble – "Takes Me Higher" (3:53)
Israel Cruz – "Party Up" (3:27)
Evanescence – "What You Want" (3:41)
Birds of Tokyo – "Wild at Heart" (4:00)
Eskimo Joe – "Echo" (3:50)
Faker – "Dangerous" (3:37)
360 – "Killer" (3:49)
Emeli Sandé – "Heaven" (4:11)
Benny Benassi featuring Gary Go – "Cinema" (3:02)
Dirty Vegas – "Little White Doves" (3:37)

Disc 2
Flo Rida – "Good Feeling" (4:08)
Katy Perry – "E.T." (3:26)
Afrojack featuring Eva Simons – "Take Over Control" (3:30)
The Potbelleez – "From the Music" (3:10)
Ian Carey featuring Snoop Dogg and Bobby Anthony – "Last Night" (3:11)
Wiz Khalifa – "Black and Yellow" (3:37)
Lupe Fiasco – "The Show Goes On" (3:59)
The Wombats – "Our Perfect Disease" (3:44)
You Me at Six – "Loverboy" (3:17)
Sick Puppies – "Riptide" (3:13)
The Kooks – "Junk of the Heart (Happy)" (3:10)
Grouplove – "Itchin' on a Photograph" (4:21)
Lady Antebellum – "We Owned the Night" (3:19)
Kimbra – "Good Intent" (3:34)
James Blunt – "I'll Be Your Man" (3:38)
San Cisco – "Awkward" (2:37)
Professor Green – "At Your Inconvenience" (3:32)
Tinie Tempah featuring Kelly Rowland – "Invincible" (3:23)
Kylie Minogue – "Put Your Hands Up (If You Feel Love)" (3:39)
Alex Gaudino featuring Kelly Rowland – "What a Feeling" (3:00)
Shave – "Change Your Heart" (3:21)

References

External links
NOW: The Hits of Summer 2012 @ Spotify

2011 compilation albums
Now That's What I Call Music! albums (Australian series)
EMI Records compilation albums